The Norway Scholarship is a scholarship to the University of Oxford that is awarded in Norway. Norway Scholars receive funding for one or two years of study and research at Oxford University, and the scholar always becomes a member of Wadham College.

The first Norway Scholarship was awarded in 1920. Since then, one Norway Scholar has been selected annually, except for a few periods, such as during the Second World War. The scholarship is highly competitive, and is awarded to a current student, or recent graduate of Oslo University. Past Norway Scholars have included  Nordahl Grieg, Peter A. Munch and Harald Sverdrup.

History
The idea for a scholarship fund enabling students from Royal Frederik University, (now University of Oslo) to study for one year at Wadham College in Oxford was conceived in 1919 by a young alumnus of the college, who during the war years 1914–18 had held the post of British vice-consul at Kristiansund in Møre og Romsdal, Norway.  Arthur Ivor Garland Jayne (1882-1958) was a son of  Francis Jayne (1845–1921) Lord Bishop of Chester. Arthur Jayne had married Fredrikke Marie Cathrine von Munthe af Morgenstierne, daughter of Professor Bredo Henrik von Munthe af Morgenstierne (1851–1930), Rector of the University of Oslo (1912–1918). As with famous Polar explorer Fridtjof Nansen, he gave NOK 5000.- towards the establishment of a Norwegian Oxford Scholarship Fund. Altogether Jayne succeeded in raising NOK. 60 000.- or approximately GBP 2780. Jayne spent his later life as a lecturer in English at the University of Oslo.

Arthur Jayne retrospectively explained his initiative in a letter dated 14. October 1945 to Professor Didrik Arup Seip (1884–1963), then Rector of Oslo University, in the following words:

At the time of the first world war – - – a considerable amount of ‘Allied’ propaganda material, sent to Norway and intended to inform Norwegian opinion about the war, proved ill-adapted to enlist the understanding sympathy of those who had previously had cultural or business contacts with the nations in conflict with the Allies. The experience seemed to indicate the great importance of any educational facilities which would bring the youth of Norway and Britain into really close association with each other. It struck me that one useful step in that direction could be some permanent arrangement which would enable Norwegian students to participate in the typically English form of university life that exists in the college system of Oxford and Cambridge. Without actual residence in a college this is impossible. But whereas foreign students have been able to attend courses at English universities, it has always been very difficult for them to obtain permission to reside at a college, sharing to the full all that the college environment can offer.

From 1920, with the exception of the years 1926–27 and  the war years 1940–44, Norwegian students were awarded the Norway Scholarship for studies of the most varied description. However, as the basic funding of the scholarship proved inadequate, the scholars soon became dependent on supplementary grants from other university funds, but from the late 1970s even this arrangement proved inadequate to meet rising costs. For some years no scholars were appointed at all. The basic foundation capital had by then shrunk to only NOK. 130 000.- (about GBP 6500.- at the current rate of exchange). 

In the late 1970s Alf Bøe (Wadham. 1952) as head of the Committee, called on  Andor Birkeland (Wadham. 1946) of the Norwegian Broadcasting Corporation,  accountant Sven Guldberg (Wadham. 1937) and former Minister for Culture Helge Sivertsen (Wadham. 1938). With the help of the College and of William Bentley, British Ambassador to Norway, they were able to raise NOK 1 170 000 (around GBP 117 000). In the 1990s Bøe formed a new committee consisting of Michael Benskin (St. Peter's. 1965), Haakon Melander (Balliol. 1966) and Erik Rudeng (Norway scholar. 1969). Iver B. Neumann (Norway Scholar. 1988) was recruited in 1993. When Bøe retired in 2003, Neumann took over as chair. Bjørn Blindheim (Norway Scholar. 1992) and Neumann formed a Norwegian chapter of the Oxford Society, with Blindheim as chair. Since 1981 the Committee has organised an annual dinner with a guest of honour from Oxford University, who has also given one or more lectures locally in Oslo. King Harald V of Norway (Balliol College.1960) often participates at the grand dinner of Norway Scholars that is held each year in Oslo by the Oxford University Society Norway.

Past Norway Scholars

References

External links
Oxford University Society Norway 
Education in Norway
Scholarships in the United Kingdom
Awards and prizes of the University of Oxford
1920 establishments in England
1920 establishments in Norway
Wadham College, Oxford
Awards established in 1920
Norway–United Kingdom relations